Bob Bryan and Mike Bryan were the defending champions, but lost in the quarterfinals to Mahesh Bhupathi and Mark Knowles.

Jonathan Erlich and Andy Ram won in the final 7–5, 7–6(4), against Arnaud Clément and Michaël Llodra. They became the first all-Israeli pair to win a Grand Slam title.

Seeds

Draw

Finals

Top half

Section 1

Section 2

Bottom half

Section 3

Section 4

External links
 2008 Australian Open – Men's draws and results at the International Tennis Federation

Men's Doubles
Australian Open (tennis) by year – Men's doubles